Aaron Christopher Krohn (born July 5, 1968) is an American actor and musician. He has worked in New York for many years; on Broadway and on television. He is also the lead singer, guitarist and songwriter for the New York–based band Notes from Underground. Their EP “Rock, Pith & Brevity” was released on September 16, 2019.

His most well known role is that of Ryoji Kaji on the ADV English dub of the anime Neon Genesis Evangelion. He also played Kaworu Nagisa in the related movies Evangelion: Death and Rebirth and The End of Evangelion.

Filmography
Battle Angel - Zapan
Blue Seed - Chief Cabinet Secretary; Jun's Father; Murakomo; Orochi-No-Orochi; Secretary; Susano-o
Burn Up W - Police Chief; Reporter; Thug A
Burn Up! - McCoy
Dragon Half - Dick Saucer
Dragon Knight - Demon; Green Dragon
Ellcia - Elluri
Fire Emblem - Nabarl
Gunsmith Cats - Senator Edward Haints (eps 2-3)
Neon Genesis Evangelion - Ryoji Kaji
Neon Genesis Evangelion: Death and Rebirth - Kaworu Nagisa/Ryoji Kaji
Neon Genesis Evangelion: The End of Evangelion - Kaworu Nagisa/Ryoji Kaji
Plastic Little - Joshua L. Balboa
Samurai Shodown: The Motion Picture - Kyoshiro; Yoshimune
Suikoden Demon Century - Miyuki Mamiya; Miyuki Mamiyo
Sukeban Deka - Kyouichiro Jin
Super Atragon - Go Arisaka/Masashi Hyuga
Those Who Hunt Elves - Bath House Master; Yuri
Welcome to New York
Law & Order SVU
Boardwalk Empire
I Love You But I Lied

New York Theatre Credits
The Invention of Love
Henry IV, Parts 1 and 2
Echoes of the War
Julius Caesar
The Coast of Utopia
The Farnsworth Invention
The Glass Cage
The Bridge Project
The Bridge Project II
Clive
Macbeth
Cabaret
Summer
The Height of the Storm
The Lehman Trilogy

Stratford Shakespeare Festival Credits
 The Homecoming by Harold Pinter (2011) – Lenny
 Henry V by William Shakespeare (2012) – King Henry V

External links

Stratford Festival bio

1968 births
American male voice actors
People from Houston
Living people
Male actors from Texas